Ulrich Giezendanner (born 31 October 1953) is a Swiss businessman and politician. He formerly served as a member of the National Council (Switzerland) for the Swiss People's Party from 1991 to 2019.

Early life and education 
Giezendanner was born 31 October 1953 in Rothrist, Switzerland. His father, Johann Ulrich Giezendanner, originally from Wattwil founded the family business known as Giezendanner in 1934. His mother operated a store which also was a coal wholesale. According to his own statements, Giezendanner completed a commercial apprenticeship, and did not pursue further education.

Career 
In 1976, Giezendanner took over the company from his parents and turned it into a stock corporation. Today the business is managed by his son Benjamin Giezendanner, since 2017 as sole managing director, after his brother Stefan was excluded from management due to internal discrepancies.

More recently, Giezendanner has become deputy chairman of KPT Health Insurance, where is also a member on the Nomination and Compensation Committee.  He remains a board member of the board of all Giezendanner companies.

Politics 
From March 1989 to November 1991, he served in the Canton of Aargau legislature. In 1991, he was elected to the National Council, representing the canton of Aargau, and since 1995 he has been the head of the Commission for Transport and Telecommunications.  Until mid-1996, he was a member of the Freedom Party of Switzerland. Since then, Giezendanner has been a member of the Swiss People's Party.

Giezendanner supported the expansion of the Baregg tunnel (a bit of a bottleneck in the Swiss motorway network) in 2003, and the adding of a second tube of the Gotthard road tunnel. He currently is an advocate of the creation of a Formula 1 circuit course in Switzerland.  The federal government's policy of shifting the heavy transit traffic to rail, has been the cause of criticism of Giezendanner, because of his work on the Baregg tunnel and on the Gotthard road tunnel.

He's a member of a Campaign for an Independent and Neutral Switzerland.

Private 
In 1975, Giezendanner married his first wife Helene (née Rüegger), who died in 1997. They had four children togethe. His eldest son, Oliver, died in infancy. His youngest son, Benjamin Giezendanner, was the youngest elected member of the Grand Council of Aargau and current member of the National Council (Switzerland), and most recently prospective candidate for Council of States (Switzerland). His elder son, Stefan Giezendanner, is a member of the Grand Council of Aargau since 2020.

Since 2017, he is married to his second wife and long-term partner Roberta Baumann (b. 1965).

Weblinks 

 Giezendanner Ulrich on the Website of the Swiss Parliament (parl.ch, in English)

References

External links

1953 births
Living people
People from Zofingen District
Freedom Party of Switzerland politicians
Swiss People's Party politicians
Members of the National Council (Switzerland)
Aargau politicians
Campaign for an Independent and Neutral Switzerland